Nuvia Magdalena Mayorga Delgado is a Mexican politician affiliated with the PRI. She served as Deputy of the LXII Legislature of the Mexican Congress representing Hidalgo.

References

1966 births
Living people
Politicians from Mexico City
Women members of the Chamber of Deputies (Mexico)
Members of the Chamber of Deputies (Mexico) for Hidalgo (state)
Institutional Revolutionary Party politicians
21st-century Mexican politicians
21st-century Mexican women politicians
Deputies of the LXII Legislature of Mexico
Senators of the LXIV and LXV Legislatures of Mexico
Members of the Senate of the Republic (Mexico) for Hidalgo (state)
Women members of the Senate of the Republic (Mexico)
Universidad Autónoma del Estado de Hidalgo alumni